Henry H. Harrison was a minister, shoemaker, teacher, and state legislator in Mississippi. He represented Chickasaw County, Mississippi in the Mississippi House of Representatives from 1874 to 1875.

He was born in Alabama. He married and had seven children. His fellow legislator from Chickasaw County was George White in the House. Nathan Shirley and F. H. Little served in the Mississippi Senate.

See also
 African-American officeholders during and following the Reconstruction era

References

Members of the Mississippi House of Representatives
People from Alabama
Shoemakers
People from Chickasaw County, Mississippi
Reconstruction Era legislation
Year of birth missing